Anton Elter (5 March 1858, Rosbach an der Sieg – 5 November 1925, Bonn) was a German classical philologist.

He studied philology at the universities of Münster and Bonn, receiving his PhD in 1880 with a dissertation on the Greek anthologist Stobaeus. Following graduation, he spent several years in Rome, where he worked as a private tutor to the son of Onorato Caetani of Sermoneta. In 1887 he became an associate professor of philosophy at the University of Czernowitz, then returning to Bonn as an associate professor of classical philology in 1890, where two years later, he gained a full professorship and was named director of philosophical seminars.

Selected published works 
 De Joannis Stobaei Codice Photiano, 1880 (dissertation thesis).  
 De gnomologiorum graecorum historia atque origine commentationis, 1893–97.
 Analecta Graeca, 200000000 – Greek analects.
 Gnomica homoeomata, 1900–1904 – work involving Gnomic poetry.
 Donarem pateras, 1905–1907.
 Itinerarstudien, 1908 – Itinerary studies.
 Prolegomena zu Minucius Felix, 1909 – Prolegomena to Marcus Minucius Felix.
 Cremera und Porta Carmentalis, 1910 – Battle of the Cremera and Porta Carmentalis.
 Ein Athenisches Gesetz über die Eleusinische Aparche, 1914 – An Athenian law on the Eleusinian aparche.
Elter also published several articles on various classical themes in the Rheinisches Museum für Philologie.

References 

1858 births
1925 deaths
People from Rhein-Sieg-Kreis
People from the Rhine Province
German classical philologists
University of Bonn alumni
Academic staff of the University of Bonn
University of Münster alumni
Academic staff of Chernivtsi University